Cercanías Bilbao (Basque: Bilboko Aldiriak) is a commuter rail network in Bilbao, serving the city and its metropolitan area. It is operated by Cercanías, as part of Renfe, the national railway company. It consists of three lines, named C-1, C-2 and C-3. All three of them start at Bilbao-Abando station, which is the central station of the city.

System 

Cercanías Bilbao follows the same patterns as other Cercanías networks in the country, as Cercanías Madrid or Cercanías Barcelona. The network consists of three lines, all of them starting at Bilbao-Abando and linking the center of Bilbao with other municipalities within the metropolitan area. There are three lines, named C-1, C-2 and C-3; the first two follow the Estuary of Bilbao, and the C-3 reaches municipalities outside the metropolitan area. The network has connections with Metro Bilbao (rapid transit), FEVE (commuter rail), Renfe (regional trains), the tram and Bilbao's bus station, Termibus.

Lines

Service frequencies 

As of October 2011, there are the typical service frequencies for each line:

Line C-1 - Trains each 30 minutes at early time in the morning and at late nights; trains each 20 minutes at peak times.
Line C-2 - Trains each 30 minutes at early time in the morning and at late nights; trains each 20 minutes at peak times.
Line C-3 - Two trains per hour early in the mornings at late at nights; up to three trains per hour at peak times.

Stations 

Cercanías Bilbao serves the following stations:

Rolling stock 

The rolling stock consists of UT 446 electrical multiple units built by CAF, each one formed by three cars.

Developments 

These are the recent projects that have been developed or will be started in the network.

Southern rail branch (C-1 and C-2) 

In year 2000 the network was renewed by the public company Bilbao Ria 2000, several new underground stations were opened in the city of Bilbao, a project that was called Southern rail branch (Variante sur ferroviaria).

This change implied the closing of Parke/Guggenheim and Bilbao-La Naja stations, on the line that run beside the river before that date. This cleared ground for the creation of new riverside avenues and the tramway. The tracks used for the new branch were used before for freight transport, these tracks were covered and a new avenue and the park of Ametzola were created on top of them. The stations on the new branch are:

 San Mamés
 Autonomía
 Ametzola
 Zabalburu

The former Bilbao-La Naja terminal station gave way to Bilbao-Abando, where C1 and C2 services arrive and depart now. Formerly this station was used only by C3 and long-distance services, to cope with the increase of traffic two new covered platforms were added to the station, increasing the number of platforms from six to eight. The remains of Bilbao-La Naja station can still be seen beside the Arenal Bridge.

The Ametzola area was a rail yard, that was dismantled to create new parks and residential areas.

Santurtzi station (C-1) 

The new Santurtzi station was built close to the old one by Bilbao Ria 2000 and inaugurated on July 10, 2003. The space that the old station occupied is used now as a parking lot, but will be renewed to extend the nearby park.

Miribilla station (C-3) 
This station was opened on December 16, 2008 and links the newly developed neighbourhoods with central Bilbao. This is Spain's deepest underground station, the access to the platforms is provided by high capacity elevators.

Amurrio Iparralde station (C-3) 
Works have started in the new Iparralde station, in the town of Amurrio.

Barakaldo station (C-1/C-2) 
This station will be renewed, 200 m of tracks will be covered, improving the newly developed neighbourhoods of Barakaldo.

Portugalete station (C-1) 
This station will be covered, a mall will be created on top of it and lifts will provide access from central Portugalete.

Vizcaya Bridge station (C-1) 
There is a proposal to build this underground station, intermediate between Portugalete and Peñota stations, that would provide a direct link to Vizcaya Bridge.

See also
 Bilbao rail network
 Metro Bilbao
 Euskotren Trena

References

External links 
 Renfe website

Cercanías
Transport in Bilbao
Rail transport in the Basque Country (autonomous community)